Bitter Harvest is a 1963 British kitchen sink drama film directed by Peter Graham Scott and starring Janet Munro and John Stride. The plot is about a young woman who rejects marriage to become a kept woman. The film is based on The Siege of Pleasure, the 1932 second volume in the trilogy 20,000 Streets Under the Sky by Patrick Hamilton.

Plot
A beautiful but intoxicated woman, Jennie Jones (Janet Munro), returns to her London apartment late one night and begins to destroy its contents in a rage, throwing her purse, keys and many of her expensive gowns out into the street. Her story is then told in flashback.

As a young girl, Jennie lives in an economically depressed, former mining town in Wales, where she works in her father's shabby general store and dreams of a more glamorous life. The store is doing poorly, and Jennie is horrified to discover that her father wants her to move to Cardiff and live with her elderly aunts as a companion and caregiver.

While walking through Cardiff, Jennie and her friend Violet meet two well-off older men, Andy and Rex. The men take the girls to a fashionable bar and club for drinks and dancing, and Jennie gets drunk and passes out in Andy's car.

She wakes up naked in bed in the men's apartment in London, having lost her virginity while drunk, and estranged herself from her father by staying out all night. She goes to meet Andy at a London pub, but when he fails to show, she is befriended by the kindly barman, Bob Williams (John Stride), to the chagrin of the barmaid Ella who is attracted to Bob.

Not wanting to return to her home, Jennie says to Bob that she is pregnant and accepts his offer of help. Bob moves her into his flat and supports them both on his wages, planning to marry her soon.

However, Jennie quickly becomes bored, and accepts an invitation from Bob's actor neighbour to attend a party in honour of a well-known producer, Karl Denny (Alan Badel). Jennie tells Bob she is attending the party to get work as a model or actress, and convinces him to give her a large sum of money to buy a proper party dress.

Denny notices Jennie at the party and asks her to see him the following night, ostensibly about an acting role. After the party, a drunken Jennie creates a disturbance when she goes home to Bob's apartment. The next night, when Jennie fails to return from her appointment with Denny, Bob goes to Denny's apartment to find her and they argue, with Jennie revealing that she is not pregnant, does not love Bob and does not want to marry him. Heartbroken, Bob leaves and Jennie becomes Denny's mistress.

The flashback ends and the film returns to the scene shown at the start. The morning after Jennie's drunken rampage, she is found dead amidst the wreckage of her apartment (including a smashed framed photograph of Denny), having overdosed on pills. The police find her address book full of men's numbers, suggesting she had been promiscuous. The ambulance carrying Jennie's body almost collides with Bob and Ella, now a happy couple oblivious to Jennie's tragic fate.

Cast
Janet Munro as Jennie Jones
John Stride as Bob Williams
Anne Cunningham as Ella 
Alan Badel as Karl Denny
Vanda Godsell as Mrs.Pitt
Terence Alexander as Andy
Richard Thorp as Rex
Barbara Ferris as Violet
Colin Gordon as Charles
Francis Matthews as Mike
William Lucas as David Medwin
Daphne Anderson as Nancy Medwin
Norman Bird as Mr. Pitt
Allen Cuthbertson as Mr. Eccles
Derek Francis as Mr. Jones
Mary Merrall as Aunt Louise
May Hallatt as Aunt Sarah
Nigel Davenport as Police Inspector
Thora Hird as Mrs Jessup (Uncredited role)
Jane Hylton as Carole (Uncredited role)

Reception
The Guardian said the film "would appear to be a further attempt to Italianize the British film industry. The story certainly seems to owe a lot to Fellini" but praised the acting.

References

External links

Bitter Harvest at Letterbox DVD
Review at Variety
Movie review at Spinning Image
Bitter Harvest at BFI

1963 films
1963 drama films
1963 independent films
Films about adultery in the United Kingdom
British drama films
British independent films
English-language Welsh films
Films about dysfunctional families
Films based on British novels
Films scored by Laurie Johnson
Films set in London
Films set in Wales
Films shot at Pinewood Studios
Films with screenplays by Ted Willis, Baron Willis
1960s English-language films
1960s British films